Keegan Orry Meth (born 8 February 1988) is a Zimbabwean cricketer. He plays domestically for the Matabeleland Tuskers and has represented Zimbabwe in One Day Internationals (ODIs). An all-rounder, he bowls right-arm medium-fast and generally bats in the lower middle order.

Early life and education 
He attended Whitestone School, Falcon College, St Georges College Harare and subsequently Christian Brothers College. His academic performance was poor, but he excelled in sport.

Career 
He made his debut for Zimbabwe in 2006, in a One Day International (ODI) against Kenya at Bulawayo. He was aged 18 at the time.

He lost three teeth, suffered a broken jaw, and lacerations to his lip when he was struck by a ball hit by Nasir Hossain off his own bowling while playing in the last ODI of the UCB Cup on August 21, 2011, against Bangladesh.

Meth made his Test debut against Bangladesh in 2013 along with Richmond Mutumbami and Timycen Maruma.  He finished with match figures of 2/57 (32 overs) and made a total of 52 runs in the match with a highest score of 31 not out.

References 

1988 births
Living people
Cricketers from Bulawayo
Alumni of Falcon College
Alumni of Christian Brothers College, Bulawayo
Zimbabwean cricketers
Zimbabwe Test cricketers
Zimbabwe One Day International cricketers
Zimbabwe Twenty20 International cricketers
Matabeleland cricketers
White Zimbabwean sportspeople